Negerpynten (Negro Point) is a headland at Edgeøya, Svalbard. It is the southernmost point of Edgeøya, and has a length of about two kilometers. The rock consists of dark shales, and reaches 326 m.a.s.l. The bay Tjuvfjorden is located between Negerpynten and Kvalpynten further northwest. To the east is the strait Halvmånesundet.

References

Headlands of Svalbard
Edgeøya